Aerosegovia was a charter airline based in Managua, Nicaragua that was formed with the assistance from Aero Caribbean. The airline ceased operations in March 2003 after the Nicaraguan Civil Aeronautics agency revoked the operating license due to lack of spare parts and other irregularities.

Services
Aerosegovia flew daily flights from Managua to:
Bluefields
Puerto Cabezas
Corn Island

In 1999 it operated a route from Managua to Tegucigalpa (Honduras) and on to Havana (Cuba), then the flight returned to Managua through Tegucigalpa.

Fleet
Aerosegovia operated the following aircraft:
1 Antonov An-32 (VN-CBV)
1 Antonov An-26B (YN-CGC)
1 Antonov An-24B (NV-CGD)

References

External links
AeroTransport Data Bank
Aerosegovia news 
Cuba routes 

Defunct airlines of Nicaragua
Airlines established in 1994
Airlines disestablished in 2003
1994 establishments in Nicaragua
Companies based in Managua